Andrew Mark Rosenthal (born February 25, 1956) is an American journalist and former editorial page editor of The New York Times. He is the son of A. M. Rosenthal, a longtime New York Times senior executive and executive editor.

While at The New York Times, he managed the paper's opinion pages, their editorial board, and the Letters and Op-Ed departments. As the paper maintained separation between editorial and journalistic operations, Rosenthal reported directly to paper's publisher.

Early life and education
Rosenthal was born in New Delhi, India. He is the son of Ann Marie (née Burke), a secretary, and A.M. Rosenthal, the former New York Times executive editor. His father was Jewish, and his mother was of Irish Catholic descent.

Rosenthal graduated from the University of Denver with a B.A. in American history in 1978.

Career 
After graduating from college, Rosenthal worked at the Associated Press, where he served as Moscow bureau chief.

Rosenthal joined The New York Times in March 1987. In Washington, D.C., Rosenthal covered the Bush Administration, the 1988 and 1992 presidential elections, and the Gulf War. In 2000, he served as national editor, covering the 2000 United States presidential election.

He became editorial page editor on January 8, 2007, and he served in that role until April 2016, longer than any other editorial page editor in the modern history of The New York Times. Rosenthal's successor as editorial page editor was James Bennet.
In March 2016, Rosenthal stepped down as editorial page editor after he had served in that role for over nine years. Rosenthal transitioned to become an online opinion columnist and podcast contributor for The New York Times.

In April 2021, Rosenthal was recruited as new editor-in-chief of Bulletin, a small, scandal-plagued, right-wing online newspaper in Sweden. In February 2022, Bulletin was declared bankrupt by Stockholm District Court due to unpaid debts. 

He is a member of the Council on Foreign Relations.

References

External links

List of all current members of The New York Times editorial board, with capsule biographies
 Rosenthal moderates extended political discussion with David Brooks, Maureen Dowd and Frank Rich, The New York Times video, July 17, 2006
 Talk to the Times - Andrew Rosenthal answers readers' questions, The New York Times, September 24–28, 2007

C-SPAN Q&A interview with Rosenthal, December 17, 2006

1956 births
Living people
The New York Times editors
The New York Times writers
University of Denver alumni
American people of Belarusian-Jewish descent
American people of Irish descent
Associated Press reporters
People from New Delhi
20th-century American journalists
20th-century American male writers
21st-century American journalists
21st-century American male writers